Kim Jin-Cheol (born 7 August 1989 in Gangwon Province) is a South Korean freestyle wrestler. He competed in the freestyle 55 kg event at the 2012 Summer Olympics and was defeated by Shinichi Yumoto in the 1/8 finals.

References

External links
 

1989 births
Living people
South Korean male sport wrestlers
Olympic wrestlers of South Korea
Wrestlers at the 2012 Summer Olympics
Sportspeople from Gangwon Province, South Korea
21st-century South Korean people